Mpaka is a town in eastern central Eswatini in western Lubombo District.

Transports 
Mpaka has one of the main railway stations in the country, serving as a connection between the Goba railway (Siphofaneni-Mpaka-Mlawula) and the Komatipoort railway (Mpaka-Mananga).

External links
On Google maps

Populated places in Lubombo Region